H. crucians  may refer to:
 Haplocyon crucians, an extinct mammal species
 Hyaenodon crucians, an extinct mammal species

See also
 Crucians (disambiguation)